Gonystylus calophyllus is a tree in the family Thymelaeaceae. The specific epithet calophyllus means "beautiful leaves".

Description
The twigs are dark brown.

Distribution and habitat
Gonystylus calophyllus is endemic to Borneo, where it is known only from Sarawak. Its habitat is lowland mixed dipterocarp forest. It is threatened by lowland deforestation.

References

calophyllus
Endemic flora of Borneo
Trees of Borneo
Flora of Sarawak
Plants described in 1897